Cebochoerus is an extinct basal artiodactyl genus belonging to the family Cebochoeridae in the superfamily Dichobunoidea. It occurred in Europe during the Early to Late Eocene.

References

Eocene even-toed ungulates
Eocene mammals of Europe
Prehistoric even-toed ungulate genera